Gottfried Wilhelm Becker (22 February 1778 – 17 January 1854) was a German physician and writer.

Biography
Becker was born and died in Leipzig. By his literary labors he accumulated $40,000. His son Karl Ferdinand, an organist and writer on musical topics, added a house worth $7,000 to this sum, and the whole was dedicated to the establishment of an educational and charitable institution for the blind in Leipzig.

References

Footnotes

General references
 Neue Haus- und Reise-Apotheke, oder medicinisches Noth- und Hülfsbüchlein : nebst einer genauen Untersuchung aller wirksamen und überall zu habenden Hausmittel ; für Oekonomen, Gutsbesitzer, Dorfprediger, Landleute und Reisende . Leipzig 1803 Digital edition by the University and State Library Düsseldorf
 Rezepte und Kurarten der besten Aerzte aller Zeiten . Vol. 1–4; several editions . Barth, Leipzig 1808–1818 Digital edition by the University and State Library Düsseldorf

External links

1778 births
1854 deaths
Physicians from Leipzig
People from the Electorate of Saxony
19th-century German physicians
Writers from Saxony
German male non-fiction writers
19th-century German translators